Sweet Jam (Persian: Morabbaye shirin) is a 2001 film by Iranian director, Marzieh Boroomand. The film was scripted by Farhad Tohidi, based on a novel by Houshang Moradi Kermani. It was lensed by Dariush Ayari. Leila Hatami, Mani Nouri, Ebrahim Abadi and Arzhang Amirfazli starred in the principal roles

Plot

Cast

References

Iranian adventure films
2001 films
2000s Persian-language films
Iranian comedy films